Sam Hopkins (born 17 February 1990) is a Wales international rugby league footballer who plays as a  for Rochdale Hornets in Betfred League 1.

Career

Leigh Centurions
Hopkins made his senior début for the Leigh Centurions on 6 March 2011 in a Challenge Cup match against amateur side the Hull Dockers. His league début came later that month on 27 March 2011 in a match against the Widnes Vikings.

Wigan Warriors
In 2014, Hopkins transferred to local rivals, the Wigan Warriors, but failed to make an appearance for the Super League club. He did however play a single game on dual-registration for Workington Town. He re-joined the Leigh Centurions on loan for most of the 2014 season.

Leigh Centurions (rejoined)
In 2015, Hopkins made his return to Leigh Centurions permanent.

In 2017 he made his Super League début for the Leigh Centurions and appeared in the 2017 Rugby League World Cup for Wales.

Toronto Wolfpack
In December 2017, Hopkins joined Toronto Wolfpack on a one-year deal.

Workington Town
In January 2019 he joined former super league side Workington Town. His new home ground is Derwent Park. He will play in league 1

Rochdale Hornets
On 23 January 2020 it was announced that Hopkins had signed for Rochdale Hornets

References

External links
Toronto Wolfpack profile
Leigh Centurions profile
Statistics at rugby-league.com
(archived by web.archive.org) Statistics at rlwc2017.com

1990 births
Living people
English people of Welsh descent
Leigh Leopards players
Rochdale Hornets players
Rugby league locks
Rugby league props
Toronto Wolfpack players
Wales national rugby league team players
Wigan Warriors players
Workington Town players